Simone Ercoli (born 5 May 1979 in Castelfiorentino, Italy) is an Italian male open water swimmer.

Ercoli is an athlete of the Gruppo Sportivo Fiamme Oro. He has swum for Italy at the:
World Championships: 2003, 2005, 2007, 2009
Open Water Worlds: 2000, 2002, 2004, 2006
European Championships: 2000, 2002, 2006, 2010

References

1979 births
Living people
People from Castelfiorentino
Italian male long-distance swimmers
Medalists at the FINA World Swimming Championships (25 m)
World Aquatics Championships medalists in open water swimming
Swimmers of Fiamme Oro
20th-century Italian people
21st-century Italian people